In Ptolemy's Geography (book 2, chapter 10), the Luna forest (Latin Luna silva, Greek Louna hule) is a geographical feature whose location is not known now with any certainty.

According to Ptolemy, the forest was located on the north bank of the Danube, downstream from the Gabreta Forest but before the southward bend leading through today's Hungary. A river flowed through the forest from the north into the Danube.

Geography of Europe
Forests of Slovakia
Lost places
Ptolemy